The 1999 NCAA Division I Men's Basketball Championship Game was the finals of the 1999 NCAA Division I men's basketball tournament and it determined the national champion for the 1998-99 NCAA Division I men's basketball season  The 1999 National Title Game was played on March 29, 1999, at Tropicana Field in St. Petersburg, Florida, The 1999 National Title Game was played between the 1999 East Regional Champions, #1-seeded Duke and the 1999 West Regional Champions, #1-seeded Connecticut.

Participants

Duke

Seeding in brackets
East
Duke (1) 99, Florida A&M (16) 58
Duke 97, Tulsa (9) 56
Duke 78, Missouri State (12) 61
Duke 85, Temple (6) 64
Final Four
 Duke 68, Michigan State 62

Connecticut

West Regional
Connecticut (1) 91, UTSA 66
Connecticut 78, New Mexico 56
Connecticut 78, Iowa 68
Connecticut 67, Gonzaga 62
Final Four
Connecticut 64, Ohio State 58

Starting lineups

Game summary

Duke's Trajon Langdon committed a traveling violation with 5.4 seconds left and his Blue Devils trailing the UConn Huskies by one, 75-74.  UConn's Khalid El-Amin was immediately fouled, and he made both free throws to put the Huskies up by three points.  The Blue Devils, who were out of timeouts, had a final chance to tie the game and force overtime, but Langdon, one of college basketball's best three-point shooters, was unable to get off a shot in the final seconds when he got triple-teamed and fell to the floor, and UConn escaped with a 77-74 victory, giving Jim Calhoun's Huskies their first national championship.

Game notes
 In the national championship game, Connecticut defeated Duke 77–74 to win their first ever national championship, snapping Duke's 32-game winning streak, and scoring the biggest point-spread upset in Championship Game history. Duke nonetheless tied the record for most games won during a single season, with 37, which they co-held until Kentucky's 38-win seasons in 2011-2012 and in 2014-2015 (The 2007-08 Memphis team actually broke this record first, but the team was later forced to forfeit their entire season due to eligibility issues surrounding the team).
 The 1999 National Championship game would be the last time Tropicana Field would host NCAA tournament games. For Duke, they had 2 straight promising seasons end on the Tropicana Field floor, with an 86-84 loss to Kentucky in the 1998 South Regional final, and then the 1999 National Championship game.
 Connecticut was a 9.5 point underdog in this game, and is the biggest point spread underdog to ever win the NCAA Division I Basketball Championship Game.

References

NCAA Division I Men's Basketball Championship Game
NCAA Division I Men's Basketball Championship Games
UConn Huskies men's basketball
Duke Blue Devils men's basketball
Basketball competitions in Florida
College sports in Florida
Sports competitions in St. Petersburg, Florida
NCAA Division I Men's Basketball Championship Game
NCAA Division I Men's Basketball Championship Game
20th century in St. Petersburg, Florida